Tony Fernandes also known as Sebastião Fernandes or Sabastyan, was an Indian politician from Goa. He was a former member of the Goa Legislative Assembly, representing the Sanguem Assembly constituency from 1963 to 1967. He also served as a cabinet minister in the first Dayanand Bandodkar ministry.

Career
Fernandes was a member of the Indian National Congress (INC) before contesting the Goa Legislative Assembly elections. He left INC to join Maharashtrawadi Gomantak Party and contested in the 1963 Goa, Daman and Diu Legislative Assembly election and emerged victorious, he served for five years from 1963 to 1967.

Fernandes was made the cabinet minister in the first Dayanand Bandodkar ministry on 20 December 1963 and was allotted Law, Labour, Industries and Agriculture as portfolios.

References

Goan people
People from South Goa district
20th-century Indian politicians
Maharashtrawadi Gomantak Party politicians
Goa, Daman and Diu MLAs 1963–1967